Latifah bint Ahmed bin Juma Al Maktoum (born 27 September 1985) is an equestrian athlete from the United Arab Emirates who competed in 2008 Summer Olympics in Beijing, the 2010 FEI World Equestrian Games in Lexington, Kentucky, and the 2013 and 2015 Show Jumping World Cup. She was the first woman to represent the United Arab Emirates at the Olympics.

She has generally ridden one of her two favorite horses, Kalaska de Semilly and Peanuts De Beaufor. In April 2019, she placed second in the 21st Emirates Show Jumping Championship, riding Cobolt 8. , Al Maktoum was training for the 2020 Summer Olympics in Tokyo.

Al Maktoum is the daughter of Sheikha Hessa bint Rashid Al Maktoum (sister of Mohammed bin Rashid Al Maktoum).

References

1985 births
Living people
Equestrians at the 2008 Summer Olympics
Maktoum family
Emirati female equestrians
Asian Games medalists in equestrian
Equestrians at the 2006 Asian Games
Equestrians at the 2010 Asian Games
Equestrians at the 2014 Asian Games
Equestrians at the 2018 Asian Games
Asian Games silver medalists for the United Arab Emirates
Asian Games bronze medalists for the United Arab Emirates
Medalists at the 2006 Asian Games
Medalists at the 2010 Asian Games
Summer Olympics competitors for the United Arab Emirates